Aquafina is a brand of bottled water products owned by PepsiCo.

Aquafina may also refer to:

Songs 
 "Aquafina", a 2015 song by 5ive Mics produced by FKi
 "Aquafina", a 2015 song by Soulja Boy
 "Aquafina", a 2019 song by Lil Peep from Everybody's Everything

Media 
 Sextina Aquafina, a fictional 2014 character from the TV series BoJack Horseman

See also

 
 
 Aquafin
 Aquavina, an experimental musical instrument
 Awkwafina (born 1988, as Nora Lum), Asian-American actress and singer